The Ambassador of the United Kingdom to Turkmenistan is the United Kingdom's foremost diplomatic representative in the Republic of Turkmenistan, and head of the UK's diplomatic mission there.  The official title is His Britannic Majesty's Ambassador to the Republic of Turkmenistan.

After the collapse of the Soviet Union, the United Kingdom recognised the independence of Turkmenistan in December 1991. Diplomatic relations were established in January 1992 and the then British ambassador to Russia, Sir Brian Fall, was also accredited to Turkmenistan until the new embassy in Ashgabat was opened in 1995.

List of heads of mission

Ambassadors
1995–1998: Neil Hook
1998–2002: Fraser Wilson
2002–2005: Paul Brummell
2005–2010: Peter Butcher
2010–2013: Keith Allan
2013–2016: Sanjay Wadvani
2016–2019: Thorhilda Abbott-Watt
 2019–2021: Hugh Philpott

 2022–present: Lucia Wilde

References

External links
UK and Turkmenistan, gov.uk

Turkmenistan
 
United Kingdom Ambassadors